Áramótaskaupið ("The New Year's Lampoon") is an annual Icelandic television comedy special, broadcast on New Year's Eve by the state public service broadcaster RÚV. Initially aired on radio, and later moving to television, it features sketches satirizing the news events of the past year.

It is often the highest-rated television broadcast of the year in Iceland. In 2002, it was reported that the special had been seen by 95.5%; CEO Páll Magnússon, CEO of RÚV stated that this was most likely a record in the Western world. Due to its high viewership, advertising time during Áramótaskaupið is the most expensive on Icelandic television.  The show ends just before midnight, and those Icelanders who shoot off fireworks usually do so after Áramótaskaupið ends.

Some of its sketches have become well known in Icelandic culture, such as its portrayal of Minister of Finance Ólafur Ragnar Grímsson as the Batman parody "Skattmann" ("Taxman"). In 2009, the show featured a sketch about the protests following the 2008 Icelandic financial crisis, in which Jón Gnarr played a strait-laced middle-aged protester shouting "Helvítis fokking fokk!!". The phrase swiftly became widely used in Iceland in relation to the crisis.

Directors
2001: Óskar Jónasson
2002: Óskar Jónasson
2003: Ágúst Guðmundsson
2004: Sigurður Sigurjónsson
2005: Edda Björgvinsdóttir
2006: Reynir Lyngdal
2007: Ragnar Bragason
2008: Silja Hauksdóttir
2009: Gunnar Björn Guðmundsson
2010: Gunnar Björn Guðmundsson
2011: Gunnar Björn Guðmundsson
2012: Gunnar Björn Guðmundsson
2013: Kristófer Dignus
2014: Silja Hauksdóttir
2015: Kristófer Dignus
2016: Jón Gnarr
2017: Arnór Pálmi Arnarsson
2018: Arnór Pálmi Arnarsson
2019: Reynir Lyngdal
2020: Reynir Lyngdal
2021: Reynir Lyngdal
2022: Dóra Jóhannsdóttir

References

Icelandic comedy television series
1966 Icelandic television series debuts
1960s Icelandic television series
1970s Icelandic television series
1980s Icelandic television series
1990s Icelandic television series
2000s Icelandic television series
2010s Icelandic television series
2020s Icelandic television series